Veronicella cubensis, common name the Cuban slug, is a species of air-breathing land slug, a terrestrial pulmonate gastropod mollusk in the family Veronicellidae, the leatherleaf slugs.

Distribution
This species occurs in countries and areas including:
 Cuba
 Introduced in California
 Introduced in Dominica

This species is already established in the USA, and is considered to represent a potentially serious threat as a pest, an invasive species which could negatively affect agriculture, natural ecosystems, human health or commerce. Therefore it has been suggested that this species be given top national quarantine significance in the USA.

References

 

Veronicellidae
Gastropods described in 1840